Elkin Soto Jaramillo (born 4 August 1980) is a Colombian football coach and former player who played as a midfielder. He is the current manager of Once Caldas' youth categories.

Club career
Soto was born in Manizales, Caldas Department.

He was one of the fundamental parts in Once Caldas Copa Libertadores 2004 historic final against Boca Juniors in which they won.

Following one season with Ecuadorian side, Barcelona SC, Soto was signed by Jurgen Klopp to play for Bundesliga side, Mainz 05, where he spent 9 seasons (2007-2016), during which time he also played for Thomas Tuchel.

On 1 February 2019, it was confirmed that Soto had returned to Once Caldas for the third time. Soto retired at the end of the 2018–19 season.

International career
He is also a starter of the Colombia national team where he plays left wing midfielder. He has been known for scoring many game-winning goals and is seen as a real leader on the field. He played the last five games of the qualifiers for the 2006 FIFA World Cup and scored against Peru, Ecuador and Uruguay. He has scored many goals in friendlies as well.

Career statistics

Club

1 Includes cup competitions such as Copa Libertadores and Copa Sudamericana.

2 Includes Superliga Colombiana matches.

3 Includes UEFA Champions League and UEFA Europa League matches.

International goals
Scores and results lists Colombia's goal tally first.

Honours

Club
Once Caldas
 Categoría Primera A: 2003-I
 Copa Libertadores: 2004

References

External links
 
 
 

Living people
1980 births
People from Manizales
Association football midfielders
Colombian footballers
Colombian expatriate footballers
Colombia international footballers
Once Caldas footballers
Barcelona S.C. footballers
1. FSV Mainz 05 players
Expatriate footballers in Germany
Expatriate footballers in Ecuador
Categoría Primera A players
Ecuadorian Serie A players
Bundesliga players
2. Bundesliga players
2011 Copa América players
Once Caldas managers